State Trunk Highway 64 (WIS 64) is a  highway in Wisconsin, which runs from the St. Croix Crossing bridge as a continuation of Minnesota State Highway 36 (MN 36) near Stillwater, Minnesota, and continues east to its eastern terminus in downtown Marinette, where it terminates at US Highway 41 (US 41) at an intersection on the corner of Marinette and Hall Avenue. Along the way, Highway 64 runs east–west through eight counties across northern Wisconsin.

Route description

State line to Bloomer
WIS 64 begins at the St. Croix Crossing bridge at the Wisconsin–Minnesota state line. The highway continues as a four–lane freeway bypassing Houlton for approximately a mile, before meeting and running concurrently with WIS 35 for  until Somerset. WI 64 is a limited-access freeway from 150th Avenue in Houlton until 85th Street and Raleigh Road in Somerset. Continuing east, the highway is an expressway with at-grade intersections until 145th Street in New Richmond. From 145th Street on, the route is a two-lane surface road. In Cylon, Wisconsin WIS 64 runs concurrently with US 63 from the US 63/WIS 46 (known locally as 'Four Corners') junction until 260th Street.

WSI 64 winds through Dunn County, running through mostly rural areas and unincorporated towns. Approximately half-way through its routing in the County, WIS 64 runs concurrently with Wisconsin Highway 25. After passing the Hay Creek Public Hunting Grounds, WIS 64 crosses the Red Cedar River before crossing into Chippewa County. Highway 64 continues east through Chippewa County, crossing US 53 at exit 112, just north of Bloomer.

Bloomer to Antigo
WIS 64 runs concurrently with WIS 40 for about  before WIS 40 turns north towards US 8. Just south of Cornell, WIS 64 meets the northern terminus of WIS 178 before crossing the Chippewa River and into Cornell as Bridge Street.

In downtown Cornell, WIS 64 intersects with WIS 27 at South 3rd Street. The two state highways run concurrently out of the city to the Cornell Municipal Airport. WIS 27 turns north towards Ladysmith, while WIS 64 continues east into Taylor County.

WIS 64 becomes Main Street in Gilman, intersecting with IWS 73 east of the village. WIS 64 and WIS 73 continue south across the Yellow River before WIS 73 continues south towards Thorp. WIS 64 runs along the southern border of Chequamegon National Forest en route to Medford, where it becomes Broadway Avenue. WIS 64 then crosses WIS 13 at 8th Street on the east side of the city. Outside of the unincorporated town of Goodrich, WIS 64 meets the northern terminus of WIS 97 (Mink Drive). WIS 64 continues slightly northwest into Goodrich before entering Lincoln County. WIS 64 continues on for about  before intersecting WIS 107. WIS 64 and WIS 107 continue north for  before turning east and into the city of Merrill, where they become Main Street.

WIS 64 and WIS 107 run alongside the Wisconsin River, crossing it on the west side of Merrill before WIS 107 continues northwest on Grand Avenue. WIS 64 continues east across the Prairie River as 1st Street into downtown. At North Polk Street, WIS 64 splits into two one-way streets; eastbound traffic continues for about seven blocks on East 1st Street, while westbound traffic takes East 2nd Street past the post office, Prairie River Middle School, and on to North Polk Street. Two blocks east of the Lincoln County Courthouse at Center Avenue (also known as County Highway K), WIS 64 turns south for one block and back to East Main Street. It then continues east out of the city to US 51 at exit 208.

East of the US 51 freeway, WIS 64 crosses the southern terminus of WIS 17, then heads east towards Langlade County. WIS 64 takes a brief  turn south with County Highway X before crossing the county line.

WIS 64 continues east towards the city of Antigo. A new detour opened in the fall of 2011 that now has WIS 64 bypassing downtown Antigo. It crosses US 45 and WIS 47, and merges with WIS 53 on the north side of Antigo. WIS 52 and 64 continue east while US 45 and WIS 47 continue north.

Antigo to Marinette
About a mile (1.6 km) outside of Antigo, WIS 52 turns northeast at Langlade Road, just north of Langlade County Airport. WIS 64 continues due east, going through the towns of Polar, Elton, White Lake, and Langlade. WIS 64 then enters the western boundary of the Nicolet National Forest before entering Oconto County.

WIS 64 continues through the wooded hills of the national forest before intersecting with WIS 32. The two highways turn to the southeast along the Oconto River into the town of Mountain. After passing Chute Pond Park, WIS 32 turns toward the south towards Breed while WIS 64 heads east along the southern edge of the National Forest into Marinette County.

WIS 64 is the county line between Oconto and Marinette for  before entering Marinette County. On the northern edge of the city of Pound, WIS 64 intersects with US 141 before continuing east toward the city of Marinette. Upon entering Marinette, WIS 64 becomes Hall Avenue, continuing downtown until it reaches its eastern terminus at US 41 (Marinette Avenue) at State Street. US 41 continues east on Hall Avenue to Bridge Street and into the state of Michigan.

History
Initially, WIS 64 ran from WIS 38 (now US 141) in Pound to WIS 15 (now US 41) in Marinette. During the early 1920s, WIS 64 gradually extended westward all the way to Minnesota. Most parts of the route followed its present-day alignment. In 1926, a part of WIS 64 from Mountain to Pound was rerouted northward.

In August 2017, the westernmost part of WIS 64 moved southward in favor of moving from the old Stillwater Lift Bridge to the new St. Croix Crossing.

Major intersections

Special routes

Somerset business loop

Business State Trunk Highway 64 (Bus. WIS 64) is a business loop of WIS 64, running through downtown Somerset.

New Richmond business spur

Business State Trunk Highway 64 (Bus. WIS 64) is a business spur of WIS 64, running through downtown New Richmond.

See also

References

External links

WIS 35/64 project
St Croix River Crossing Project-Mn DOT

064
Transportation in St. Croix County, Wisconsin
Transportation in Dunn County, Wisconsin
Transportation in Chippewa County, Wisconsin
Transportation in Taylor County, Wisconsin
Transportation in Lincoln County, Wisconsin
Transportation in Langlade County, Wisconsin
Transportation in Oconto County, Wisconsin
Transportation in Marinette County, Wisconsin